Gary Grainger (born 24 September 1949) is a former Australian rules footballer who played with Essendon in the Victorian Football League (VFL). His father, George, also played VFL football, for St Kilda. After leaving Essendon, Grainger played for and captained Preston in the Victorian Football Association (VFA), was captain-coach of Tasmanian side East Devonport, captain-coached Epping back in Victoria, and was captain-coach of Lalor in the Diamond Valley Football League.

Notes

External links 
		

Essendon Football Club past player profile

Living people
1949 births
Australian rules footballers from Victoria (Australia)
Essendon Football Club players
Stawell Football Club players
Preston Football Club (VFA) players
East Devonport Football Club players
Epping Football Club players
Lalor Football Club players